Pocket is an unincorporated community in Lee County, Virginia, United States.

Pocket was intended as a descriptive name for the town site situated in a small river valley.

References

Unincorporated communities in Lee County, Virginia
Unincorporated communities in Virginia